The Bowin P8 is a Formula 5000 and Formula 2 racing car, which was designed and built between 1972 and 1974 by Bowin.

Specifications 

The chassis was a high-rigidity monocoque design of high-strength alloy and steel, utilising the latest techniques in assembly, with emphasis placed on ease of maintenance and repair.  This supported a body which was a full aerodynamic wedge, incorporating side radiators. The interior of the cockpit was covered in fully moulded seat and trim sections, making it exceptionally comfortable and roomy.

The rear suspension incorporated twin radius arms, parallel links, Armstrong adjustable dampers, and fully adjustable spherical bearings throughout.  The front suspension was a double-wide-based wishbone design with Armstrong adjustable dampers and fully adjustable spherical bearings throughout. The coil spring units for both front and rear were mounted inboard with "Bowin variable rate spring control".

The P8 was steered by a cam-adjustable magnesium rack and pinion designed by Bowin, with an energy absorbing steering column surmounted by a leather-covered steering wheel. The brakes were Girling  disc brakes with alloy caliper assemblies. The twin braking system was adjustable for length and had an adjustable-ratio balance control. The rear brakes were mounted inboard on the gearbox to reduce unsprung weight.

The transmission was a Hewland FT2000, providing five speeds and reverse, and it had an alloy adaptor plate.  The hydraulic clutch system was complete, up to and including the release mechanism on the gearbox.

The engine was water-cooled by twin, cross-flow, lightweight, side-mounted radiators, with a deaireator control tank and pressure cap. The alloy oil tank was incorporated in the monocoque body and was fitted with antisurge baffles, a deaireator system, alloy pipes, hoses and fittings, and an alloy oil cooler. Fuel was contained in cells in the side panels. The P8 was supplied with engine mountings.

The electrical system was powered by a 12 volt, lightweight, aircraft battery, which had a master battery control. It powered a starter solenoid via starter button and switches, as well as an array of instruments, including tachometer (0–10,000 rpm), oil pressure, water temperature, and oil temperature.

All suspension parts were in new Bowin Satin finish, and the other parts were cadmium-plated and stove-enamelled. The body was painted in a colour of the customer's choice.

References 

Bowin Cars
Formula Two cars
Formula 5000 cars
Tasman Series cars